2gether (stylized as 2ge+her: The Series) is a sitcom that aired on MTV from August 15, 2000 until March 19, 2001. The series was cancelled after two seasons due to the death of the youngest band member, Michael Cuccione, in early 2001.

Synopsis
2gether began as a movie and spun-off into an MTV series about a faux boy band that parodied the popular boy bands of the 90s, such as The Backstreet Boys and New Kids on the Block.

Cast
Evan Farmer as Jerry O' Keefe – "The Heartthrob"
Alex Solowitz as Mickey Parke – "The Bad Boy"
Noah Bastian as Chad Linus – "The Shy One" 
Kevin Farley as Doug Linus – "The Older Brother"
Michael Cuccione as Jason "Q.T." McKnight – "The Cute One"

Episodes

Season 1 (2000)

Season 2 (2001)

References

External links
 

2000s American sitcoms
2000s American musical comedy television series
2000 American television series debuts
2001 American television series endings
2000s Canadian sitcoms
2000s Canadian music television series
2000 Canadian television series debuts
2001 Canadian television series endings
English-language television shows
MTV original programming
Television shows filmed in Burnaby
Television shows filmed in Vancouver
Unaired television episodes